Porpora is an Italian surname. Notable people with this surname include:
Francesco Antonio Porpora (1575-1640), Italian Roman Catholic prelate
Gabriella Porpora (born 1942), Italian artist
Kenny Porpora (born either 1986 or 1987), American author
Nicola Porpora (1686-1768), Italian composer
Mauro Porpora (born 1969), Italian paralympic athlete
Paolo Porpora (1617-1673), Italian painter

See also
Donato Porpora, a major antagonist in Tokyo Ghoul

Italian-language surnames